The New Lots Avenue station is the eastern (railroad southern) terminal of the IRT New Lots Line of the New York City Subway. It is the terminal for the 3 train at all times except late nights, when the 4 train takes over service. During rush hours, occasional 2, 4, and 5 trains also stop here.

History 
The New Lots Line was built as a part of Contract 3 of the Dual Contracts between New York City and the Interborough Rapid Transit Company, including the New Lots Avenue station. It was built as an elevated line because the ground in this area is right above the water table, and as a result the construction of a subway would have been prohibitively expensive. The first portion of the line between Utica Avenue and Junius Street opened on November 22, 1920, with shuttle trains operating over this route. The line opened one more stop farther to the east to Pennsylvania Avenue on December 24, 1920.

While work at this station and at Van Siclen Avenue was practically completed in 1921, they could not open yet because trains could not run to the terminal until track work, the signal tower, and the compressor room were in service. Work began on June 19, 1922, and shuttles started operating between Pennsylvania Avenue and New Lots Avenue on October 16, 1922. A two-car train operated on a single track on the northbound track. On October 31, 1924, through service to New Lots Avenue was begun.

As part of an 18-month capital budget that took effect on January 1, 1963, this station was reconstructed.

In 1968, as part of the proposed Program for Action, the IRT New Lots Line would have been extended southerly through the Livonia Yard to Flatlands Avenue to a modern terminal at Flatlands Avenue and Linwood Street, replacing the New Lots Avenue terminal. This line would have run at ground level and it would have provided better access to the then-growing community of Spring Creek. This extension would have been completed at the cost of $12 million.

In 2019, the MTA announced that this station would become ADA-accessible as part of the agency's 2020–2024 Capital Program.

Station layout

This elevated station has two tracks and one island platform. The station has an active tower and crew quarters at platform level. The platform has a canopy for most of its length.

To the east of the station, the tracks curve into Livonia Yard. This extension was a provision for the line to continue east on New Lots Avenue.

Exits
The station's sole exit is two staircases to either western corner of Livonia Avenue and Ashford Street via an elevated, wooden mezzanine/station house under the far eastern end of the platform.

References

External links 

 
 Station Reporter — 3 Train
 The Subway Nut — New Lots Avenue Pictures
 Ashford Street entrance from Google Maps Street View
 Platform from Google Maps Street View

IRT New Lots Line stations
East New York, Brooklyn
New York City Subway stations in Brooklyn
New York City Subway terminals
Railway stations in the United States opened in 1922
1922 establishments in New York City